Walter Gladisch (2 January 1882 – 23 March 1954) was a German admiral whose military service spanned more than 42 years.

References 

1882 births
1954 deaths
Military personnel from Berlin
German admirals
Recipients of the Iron Cross
Recipients of the Hanseatic Cross
Kriegsmarine personnel of World War II
Imperial German Navy personnel of World War I